The  2014–15 Michigan State Spartans men's basketball team represented Michigan State University in the 2014–15 NCAA Division I men's basketball season. The Spartans, led by 20th year head coach Tom Izzo, played their home games at the Breslin Center in East Lansing, Michigan as members of the Big Ten Conference. MSU finished with a record of 27–12, 12–6 in Big Ten play to finish in a three-way tie for third place. They defeated Ohio State and Maryland to advance to the Big Ten tournament championship where they lost to Wisconsin. They received an at-large bid to the NCAA tournament as the No. 7 seed in the East region. They defeated Georgia and Virginia to advance to the Sweet Sixteen. There they defeated Oklahoma and Louisville to advance to the Final Four for the seventh time under Tom Izzo. There the Spartans lost to eventual National Champion, Duke.

Previous season 
The Spartans finished the 2013–14 season with a record of 29–9, 12–6 in Big Ten play to finish in second place. They won the Big Ten tournament by defeating Michigan and received the conference's automatic bid as a No. 4 seed in the NCAA tournament, their 17th straight trip to the Tournament. They advanced to the Elite Eight, their eighth trip under Tom Izzo, before losing to eventual National Champion, UConn.

The Spartans lost Adreian Payne (16.4 points and 7.3 rebounds per game) and Gary Harris (16.7 points per game) to the NBA draft and Keith Appling (11.2 points per game) to graduation (eventually to the NBA) following the season.

Offseason

2014 recruiting class
Tom Izzo again went big in recruiting for the 2014 season and again was shunned. Michigan State made offers to Cliff Alexander, Tyus Jones, Jahlil Okafor, and Tyler Ulis, but all went to other schools. As a result, MSU signed only top 100 player, Lourawls Nairn, Jr. Analysts have argued that it is Izzo's unwillingness to cheat that has cost him some of these recruits.

Roster

Season summary 
Michigan State was led by seniors Travis Trice (15.3 points and 5.1 assists per game) and Branden Dawson (11.9 points and 9.1 rebounds per game) and junior Denzel Valentine (14.5 points, 6.3 rebounds, and 4.3 assists per game). The Spartans started the season ranked No. 18 in the country.

The Spartans had two players transfer to the team. Eron Harris transferred from West Virginia. Under NCAA transfer rules, Harris had to redshirt for the 2014–15 season. Bryn Forbes transferred from Cleveland State. The NCAA granted Forbes a waiver due to family hardship that allowed Forbes to play immediately without having sit out a season.

MSU began the season with a trip to play Navy in Annapolis, Maryland at the Naval Academy. The Spartans survived a scare to win a close game 64–59. The Spartans then traveled to Indianapolis, Indiana to participate in the Champions Classic, but were unable to outlast Duke (whom they would later meet in the Final Four), losing 81–71. MSU won their next four games, including wins over Santa Clara, Rider, and Marquette in the Orlando Classic. In the championship game of the Orlando Classic, the Spartans fell to No. 11 Kansas 61–56. Despite the loss, MSU moved up to No. 19 in the polls. In the ACC–Big Ten Challenge, MSU could not hold off Notre Dame, losing in overtime 79–78. Wins followed against smaller schools including Oakland and Eastern Michigan before MSU was shocked by Texas Southern at home in overtime. Following the loss, the Spartans went unranked the remainder of the season. They finished the non-conference season at 9–4.

In the Big Ten season, the Spartans were swept by Maryland and suffered bad losses to Nebraska, Illinois, and Minnesota in overtime. However, the Spartans rallied late in the season, winning six of their last eight conference games including a win over No. 23 Ohio State and wins at Michigan and at Illinois. MSU finished the season in a three-way tie for third place in conference. The Spartans finished the season with an overall record of 21–10, 12–6 in the Big Ten regular season. The Spartans got hot in the Big Ten tournament beating Ohio State and No. 8 Maryland. They challenged No. 6 Wisconsin for the tournament title, eventually losing the Big Ten tournament Championship in overtime.

The Spartans received an at-large bid in the NCAA tournament as a No. 7 seed in the East Region. The bid was MSU's 18th straight trip to the NCAA Tournament. MSU beat Georgia in the First Round and surprised No. 2-seeded and No. 6-ranked Virginia in the Second Round. With the win, the Spartans advanced to their fourth straight Sweet Sixteen and seventh Sweet Sixteen in eight years. In the Sweet Sixteen, they faced No. 3-seeded and No. 13-ranked Oklahoma. MSU defeated Oklahoma by four. Valentine scored 18 points and Trice contributed 24. The win sent MSU to the Elite Eight for the second consecutive year and their fourth trip since 2009. Louisville awaited the Spartans in the Elite Eight. The Spartans were pushed to overtime, but again came up with the victory, earning a trip to their seventh Final Four under Tom Izzo. Trice was named the Regional's MVP.  In the Final Four, the Spartans fell to the eventual National Champions for the second straight season, losing a rematch of their Champions Classic game to Duke in the National Semifinal.

Schedule and results

|-
!colspan=9 style=| Exhibition

|-
!colspan=9 style=| Non-conference regular season

|-
!colspan=9 style=|Big Ten regular season

|-
!colspan=9 style=|Big Ten tournament

|-
!colspan=9 style=|NCAA tournament

Player statistics

Rankings

*AP does not release post-NCAA tournament rankings

Awards and honors

Post-season awards

Branden Dawson 

 All Big Ten Second Team
 Big Ten All-Defensive Team
 NABCA All-District Second Team
 USBWA All-District Team

Travis Trice 

 All Big Ten Third Team
 NCAA Tournament East Region Most Outstanding Player

Denzel Valentine 

 All Big Ten Third Team
 USBWA All-District Team
 NCAA Tournament All-East Regional Team

References

Michigan State Spartans men's basketball seasons
Michigan State
Michigan State
NCAA Division I men's basketball tournament Final Four seasons
2014 in sports in Michigan
2015 in sports in Michigan